Tangerine Tree was a fan project operating from 2002 through 2006 with the goal of collecting, preserving and distributing unreleased concerts and other audio material by the band Tangerine Dream. The creators of the Tangerine Tree project received permission from Tangerine Dream to release the collection on a strict non-profit basis. Several of the Tangerine Tree volumes have been used as the basis for official Tangerine Dream releases. The project collected just under 300 hours of material (291:39:26).

Material was collected from audience recordings, soundboard recordings, recordings of radio and TV transmissions and in some cases the purchase of studio masters. Only recordings of a high quality and a unique nature were considered for the core Tangerine Tree volumes. These recordings were professionally re-mastered and released on CD-R and accompanied by high quality artwork for the CD labels and case liners.

Tangerine Leaves releases were based on material that did not meet the quality standards of the Tangerine Tree or from concerts that were not considered notable among a series of concerts. If a better source was found, a Tangerine Leaves volume might have been deprecated and replaced by a Tangerine Tree volume. Starting from 1980, the music played during each of the shows in a single Tangerine Dream concert tour were very similar, so it was impractical to release many volumes of the Tangerine Tree with similar content.

Audio DVD Tree volumes consisted of about two sets of the Tangerine Tree volumes on a DVD that played to a slideshow of the CD artwork. These releases were standard DVDs with a menu structure and were available in both PAL and NTSC versions.

History
For almost four decades, much of this material had been traded on an informal basis and many were sold as bootlegs. Much was unidentified, misidentified, low quality and/or a multiple generation copy. Tapes were starting to degrade, as many were as much as forty years old. In the late 1990s, several collectors created the Digital Tape Tree project and distributed the material on CD-R. Collector Heiko Heerssen received permission from Tangerine Dream as long as there was no commercial gains from the project and on 9 January 2002 began to make appeals on the Tangerine Dream discussion group to gather all of the material together and create a formal project that would use the best available sources to provide the definitive version of each recording. A large number of previously unknown recordings were discovered and included in the project. All of the Digital Tape Tree volumes were replaced by later Tangerine Tree or Tangerine Leaves volumes.

In September 2002, before Tangerine Tree set three was released, an interim Classic Tree was established for distributing copies of non-remastered already-circulating bootlegs. All of the concerts used in the Classic Tree were subsequently released as Tangerine Tree volumes in superior quality, rendering the Classic Tree volumes and the bootlegs they represented obsolete.

When new sets were released, standard audio versions on CD-R were traded by signing up on the project home page on a "blanks and stamps" basis where the only actual trade was of blank CDs and shipping. To reduce the number of CDs involved in the trade, the audio tracks were compressed using the shorten lossless compression format.

The Tangerine Tree project was discontinued on 17 October 2006 by Heiko Heerssen due to legal concerns and personal reasons. Releases now can be easily found on the Internet and most reputable trading sites will post those that have not been converted to official releases.

Live concerts by date

1968–1974

1975 Australian Tour & London show, with line-up of Froese, Franke, Michael Hoenig

1975 France and U.K. Tours  — Ricochet
Ricochet is a composite "live" album, produced from hours of audio tape recorded during the French and British tours. The only definitively identified source is "Ricochet, Part Two" from the 23 October 1975 concert at Croydon Fairfield Halls.

1976 European Tours

1976 European Tour — Stratosfear

1977 North America Tour — Encore

1978 European Tour — Cyclone

1980 East Berlin — Pergamon

1980 European Tour — Thief

1981 European Tour

1981 British Tour — Exit

1982 Australian Tour

1982 European Tour — White Eagle, Logos

1983 Japanese Tour

1983 European Tour

1986 European Tour — Underwater Sunlight

1986 North American Tour — Underwater Sunlight

1987

1988 North American Tour — Optical Race

1990

1990 British Tour — Melrose

1992 North American Tour — 220 Volt

1995

1996–1997 — Tournado

1997 UK tour

1999–2005

Notes
 "r" indicates a volume or part of a volume re-released in a later set, generally because a higher quality or more complete source was found.
 "n" indicates a new volume that completely replaced an older volume that was deprecated.
 After Tangerine Leaves 9 was released in set 1, a better recording was found and it was replaced by Tangerine Tree 53. Tangerine Leaves set 5 released a different concert as Tangerine Leaves 9 to fill in the gap.
 "TD" indicates official Tangerine Dream releases.
 Decimals indicate volumes that have been split because they contain multiple concerts. For example, Tangerine Tree 59 consists of two concerts in one volume and is split as 59.1 and 59.2.
 Concerts split across multiple volumes, such as Tangerine Leaves 10 and 11, are listed on one line.

Other releases
Other volumes are mixed collections of tracks from various concerts, films, radio interviews and unlabeled volumes.

Sets
Volumes were released in batch sets.

References

Bootleg recordings